EzerNet Ltd. was a wireless and cable Internet service provider in Latvia, offering FTTH, MVDS, (pre-)WiMax and satellite access. In 2009 the company went bankrupt.
EzerNet was a holder of 42 GHz frequency licence in Latvia.

References

External links 
 http://www.ezernet.lv

Companies based in Liepāja
Telecommunications companies established in 1999
Internet service providers of Latvia
1999 establishments in Latvia